The Hotel Australia was a former hotel in Melbourne, Australia. The hotel was built in 1939 on the site of the former Cafe Australia (which had opened in 1916), and was demolished in 1989.

Designed by Leslie M. Perrott, the Hotel Australia was a 12-storey building with 94 rooms, numerous private dining and function rooms, and was the most prestigious hotel in Melbourne in its day. The hotel included two small cinemas, a restaurant and bar in the basement, and a through-block shopping arcade on the ground floor which was touted as the largest in Australia, known as the Australia Arcade.

The site is now occupied by a Novotel hotel and the shopping arcade St. Collins Lane.

History
From the 1970s, the north side of Collins Street between Swanston and Elizabeth Streets became the most fashionable shopping area in Melbourne, known as ‘the block’. The Cafe Gunsler was established in 1879, located in the centre of the block, and was one of most fashionable restaurants and event venues in the city. It was refurbished in 1890 and renamed the Vienna Cafe, which was bought in 1908 by another prominent restaurateur, the Greek Australian Anthony Lucas. During 1916, World War 1, the cafe was closed due to its German associations.

Lucas employed the recently arrived Walter Burley Griffin, who worked with his wife Marion Mahony Griffin, to design an extensive new cafe, with the more patriotic name of the Cafe Australia, that was initially to include a concert hall, and ‘winter garden’. Opening in October 1916, the cafe featured series of rooms, an entry bar, a Palm Court, a Fountain Court, leading through to the main arched roofed double height dining room. It was adorned with painted murals, sculpture and highly patterned plasterwork, and specially designed furniture and fittings, in the Griffin’s distinctive angular geometric style.

The hotel was sold by Lucas in 1927 for 20,000 pounds to Fred Matear and Norman Carlyon and completely refurbished in the process.

In 1937, plans for the new Hotel Australia was announced. The scheme for the twelve-story building included an arcade which would connect Collins to Little Collins, and line up with other lanes and arcades connecting Flinders Street right through to Bourke Street. In recognition of the popularity and unique design of the Cafe Australia, the hotel included an arched-roofed ballroom which was a simplified version of the cafe’s main room.

The first event held at the new hotel occurred on June 22, 1939, with a benefit gala for St. Vincent's Hospital.

During World War II, Douglas MacArthur used two floors of the hotel as his headquarters for a time.

The hotel hosted many dignitaries. Sir Robert Menzies enjoyed the hotel dining room while Harold Holt had his wedding reception at the hotel.

Demolition
The Citistate development group bought the hotel in June 1987 at a price of $55 million. While preservationists wanted to save the structures, Citistate had purchased the building in a vacant state and claimed the building was a fire hazard, despite being a graded building in a heritage precinct, the City of Melbourne allowed the demolition.

The hotel was ultimately demolished in the winter of 1989, with the fire marshal declaring the demolition site a fire hazard. The replacement building included a budget hotel on top of a three level shopping arcade, which was known as the Australia On Collins. In 2018/19 the arcade was revamped and renamed St Collins Lane, and the hotel is currently the Novotel on Collins.

See also

References

Demolished buildings and structures in Melbourne
Buildings and structures demolished in 1989
Defunct hotels in Australia
Hotels established in 1939
Collins Street, Melbourne
1939 establishments in Australia
1987 disestablishments in Australia